Shaneq (also Romanized as Shānaq and Shāneq; also known as Shanegh and Shāniq) is a village in Hastijan Rural District, in the Central District of Delijan County, Markazi Province, Iran. At the 2006 census, its population was 91, in 28 families.

References 

Populated places in Delijan County